Deerfield Beach is a city in Broward County, Florida, United States, just south of the Palm Beach County line. The city is named for the numerous deer that once roamed the area. As of the 2020 census, the population was 88,859. It is a principal city of the Miami metropolitan area, which is home to 6,166,488 inhabitants as of 2020.

History
Deerfield Beach's history dates to 1890, when a small settlement named Hillsborough was developed along the Hillsboro River. As the population grew to 20 by 1898, the settlement was now served by its own post office and the town was named Deerfield for the deer that grazed along the river.

By the early 20th century, as the town's population continued to grow, the Florida East Coast Railroad constructed tracks en route to Miami bisecting Deerfield. Deerfield's early settlers were mostly farmers who grew pineapples, tomatoes, green beans, squash and fished along the Intracoastal Waterway. Deerfield remained a largely agricultural community, but in 1939 the town's name was changed to Deerfield Beach to let tourists know it has a beach. In 1952, the original Deerfield Beach Pier was built of wood.

Demographics

2020 census

As of the 2020 United States census, there were 86,859 people, 33,439 households, and 18,962 families residing in the city.

2010 census

, there were 42,671 households, of which 21.8% were vacant. , 16.3% of households had children under the age of 18 living with them, 38.2% were married couples living together, 9.6% had a female householder with no husband present, and 48.9% were non-families. 40.3% of all households were made up of individuals, and 22.5% had someone living alone who was 65 years of age or older. The average household size was 2.02 and the average family size was 2.72.

2000 census
In 2000, the city the population was spread out, with 15.6% under the age of 18, 6.5% from 18 to 24, 28.4% from 25 to 44, 20.2% from 45 to 64, and 29.3% who were 65 years of age or older. The median age was 45 years. For every 100 females, there were 87.2 males. For every 100 females age 18 and over, there were 84.3 males.

In 2000, the median income for a household in the city was $34,041, and the median income for a family was $44,853. Males had a median income of $35,154 versus $27,451 for females. The per capita income for the city was $23,296. About 9.2% of families and 12.5% of the population were below the poverty line, including 20.3% of those under age 18 and 10.2% of those age 65 or over.

, speakers of English as a first language accounted for 75.36%, while speakers of Spanish made up 8.70%. Portuguese was spoken by 4.89%, French Creole 3.42%, French 2.16%, Italian 1.51%, and Yiddish comprised 1.17% of the population.

, Deerfield Beach also had the highest percentage of Brazilian and Brazilian American population (as a percentage of total population) in the United States at 11.06%. It also has the percentage of Haitian and Haitian American residents in the United States, at 12.1%.

Geography
Of Deerfield Beach's land mass 0.3 square miles is located on Deerfield Beach Island (DBI).

Climate
Deerfield Beach has a borderline tropical rainforest climate (Köppen climate classification: Af), bordering on a tropical monsoon climate (Köppen climate classification: Am), featuring hot summer days, frequent thunderstorms in the summer, and less frequent rain in the fall.

During the summer months average temperatures tend to be in the 80s, while during the winter temperatures tend to be in the 60s.

Summer months tend to be wetter than winter months.

Deerfield Beach falls under the USDA 10b Plant Hardiness zone.

Points of interest

 Deerfield Beach Arboretum
 Deerfield Island Park
 Quiet Waters Park
 Deerfield Beach Island (DBI)

Education
There are five public schools in Deerfield Beach, as well as numerous private institutions. Public schools are administered by Broward County Public Schools.

Public schools
 Deerfield Beach Elementary School
 Deerfield Park Elementary School
 Park Ridge Elementary School
 Quiet Waters Elementary School
 Tedder Elementary School

Middle schools:
 Deerfield Beach Middle School
 Lyons Creek Middle School in Coconut Creek
 Crystal Lake Middle School in Pompano Beach

Zoned high schools:
 Deerfield Beach High School
 Monarch High School in Coconut Creek
 Blanche Ely High School in Pompano Beach

Private schools
 Highlands Christian Academy
 St. Ambrose Catholic School

Libraries
There are two locations of the Broward County Library system in Deerfield Beach:
 Century Plaza
 Percy White

Transportation

 Deerfield Beach station served by Amtrak and Tri-Rail
 Broward County Transit

Notable people 

 Eli Abaev (born 1998), American-Israeli basketball player for Hapoel Be'er Sheva in the Israeli Basketball Premier League
 Jerry Jeudy, NFL player for the Denver Broncos
 Canton Jones, Christian hip-hop artist
 James Pierre, NFL player for the Pittsburgh Steelers
 Jason Pierre-Paul, NFL player for the Tampa Bay Buccaneers
 Denard Robinson, former NFL player for the Jacksonville Jaguars
 Devin Singletary, NFL player for the Buffalo Bills

Media
Deerfield Beach is a part of the Miami-Fort Lauderdale-Hollywood media market, which is the twelfth largest radio market and the seventeenth largest television market in the United States. Its primary daily newspapers are the South Florida Sun-Sentinel and The Miami Herald, and their Spanish-language counterparts El Sentinel and El Nuevo Herald. Local Deerfield-based media includes The Observer, a local weekly newspaper, and the Deerfield Times, published by Sun-Sentinel.

Sister city
Deerfield Beach has one sister city, as designated by Sister Cities International:

  Acre, Northern District, Israel

References

External links

 City of Deerfield Beach official website
 Deerfield Beach Historical Society

 
Beaches of Broward County, Florida
Beaches of Florida
Cities in Broward County, Florida
Cities in Florida
Populated coastal places in Florida on the Atlantic Ocean
Seaside resorts in Florida